Democratic Left of Catalonia (EDC) was a political party in Catalonia (Spain). EDC was founded in 1975 as the Catalan Liberal Party, and ideologically it defined itself as "radical liberal" and federalist. It was merged into Democratic Convergence of Catalonia (CDC) on 27 June 1978.

History
EDC was initially known as the Catalan Liberal Party (PLC) and was a member of the Liberal International. The PLC/EDC was also a part of the Coordinating Commission of Political Forces of Catalonia, the main pro-democracy opposition body of Catalonia at the time. The original ideology of the group was radical liberalism, including federalism, co-management and the nationalization of large enterprises. In April 1976 a sector led by Jaume Casanovas split from the party and founded the Social Democratic Party of Catalonia (PSDC). On 24 September 1976, together with the People's Democratic Party, the Social-Liberal Coalition was established.

In January 1977, the party signed a political alliance with Democratic Convergence of Catalonia (CDC), which ahead of the 1977 Spanish general election would transform into the Democratic Pact for Catalonia (PDC) coalition for the Congress of Deputies, together with CDC, the Socialist Party of Catalonia–Regrouping (PSC–R) and the National Front of Catalonia (FNC). The party would secure two seats out of the eleven won by the alliance, which were occupied by Ramón Trías Fargas and Maciá Alavedra, both for the Barcelona constituency. For the concurrent Spanish Senate election, EDC joined the Democracy and Catalonia coalition, comprising all four PDC parties together with the Catalan Centre (CC) and the Democratic Union of Catalonia (UDC), which won two senators, although none was for EDC.

In December 1977, a group of party members left the party to found the Catalan Association of the Liberal Left, which would end up joining Republican Left of Catalonia (ERC) in August 1978. The rest of the party would be merged into CDC in June 1978.

Electoral performance

Cortes Generales

Nationwide

Regional breakdown

References

1975 establishments in Catalonia
1978 disestablishments in Catalonia
Catalan nationalist parties
Defunct political parties in Catalonia
Liberal parties in Spain
Political parties established in 1975
Political parties disestablished in 1978
Radical parties